Antonio Tempestilli (born 8 October 1959) is an Italian former professional footballer who played as a defender.

Honours
Roma
 Coppa Italia winner: 1990–91

References

1959 births
Living people
People from Campli
Italian footballers
Association football defenders
Serie A players
Inter Milan players
Como 1907 players
A.S. Roma players
Sportspeople from the Province of Teramo
Footballers from Abruzzo